60S ribosomal protein L5 is a protein that in humans is encoded by the RPL5 gene.

Function 

Ribosomes, the organelles that catalyze protein synthesis, consist of a small 40S subunit and a large 60S subunit. Together these subunits are composed of 4 RNA species and approximately 80 structurally distinct proteins. This gene encodes a ribosomal protein that is a component of the 60S subunit. The protein belongs to the L18P family of ribosomal proteins. It is located in the cytoplasm. The protein binds 5S rRNA to form a stable complex called the 5S ribonucleoprotein particle (RNP), which is necessary for the transport of nonribosome-associated cytoplasmic 5S rRNA to the nucleolus for assembly into ribosomes. The protein interacts specifically with the beta subunit of casein kinase 2.

Clinical significance 

Variable expression of this gene in colorectal cancers compared to adjacent normal tissues has been observed, although no correlation between the level of expression and the severity of the disease has been found. This gene is co-transcribed with the small nucleolar RNA gene U21, which is located in its fifth intron. As is typical for genes encoding ribosomal proteins, there are multiple processed pseudogenes of this gene dispersed through the genome.

Interactions 

Ribosomal protein L5 has been shown to interact with:
 CSNK2B, 
 EIF5A, 
 Mdm2, and
 PDCD4.

References

Further reading

External links 
  GeneReviews/NCBI/NIH/UW entry on Diamond–Blackfan Anemia
  OMIM entries on Diamond–Blackfan Anemia

Ribosomal proteins